Knights of Bloodsteel is a 2009 television miniseries, produced by Reunion Pictures. RHI Entertainment distributed the project internationally.

It originally aired on April 19, 2009 on SyFy.

Plot
In the faraway land of Mirabilis, the warlord Dragon-Eye has unleashed his terrifying forces to hunt down the source of all power, a legendary Crucible. With freedom hanging in the balance, a motley band of knights embarks on a dangerous mission to fight against the dreaded assassins, dragons and soldiers of Dragon-Eye and rescue their world from the clutches of evil once and for all. The knights include Adric, a con man; John Serragoth, a warrior for hire; Perfidia, an elven fighter who is the niece of a sorcerer who sits on the kingdom's governing council; and Ber-Lak, a goblin miner who has been infected by exposure to the mystical element known as bloodsteel.

Cast

David James Elliott: John Serragoth
Michael Heltay: Grell
Natassia Malthe: Perfidia
Christopher Jacot: Adric
Dru Viergever: Ber-Lak
Peter Bryant: Swope
Mark Gibbon: Dragon Eye
Mackenzie Gray: Lord Splayven
Heather Doerksen: Orion
Christopher Lloyd: Tesselink
Adrian Hough: Malcolm
Gwynyth Walsh: Raven
Julian Christopher: Oracle
Gardiner Millar: Azenhawke
Deanna Milligan: Maya
Brenna O'Brien: Talia
Ian A. Wallace: Klegg
Leela Savasta: Fileen
Robin T. Rose: Vosjek
Stefany Mathias: Terrapine
Matt Shaw: Angus
Byron Lawson: Envoy
Antony Holland: Old Merchant
Mark Acheson: client 
John DeSantis: Goblin Strongarm

References

External links

2009 fantasy films
2009 television films
2009 films
Canadian television films
English-language Canadian films
Syfy original films
2000s American films
2000s Canadian films